Mission Ridge Winter Park is a ski resort in Saskatchewan. It is located in the Qu'Appelle Valley near Mission Lake and the town of Fort Qu'Appelle.

See also
List of ski areas and resorts in Canada

References

North Qu'Appelle No. 187, Saskatchewan
Ski areas and resorts in Saskatchewan
Division No. 6, Saskatchewan